Rachel Barrowman (born 1963) is a New Zealand author and historian, with a focus on New Zealand cultural and intellectual history.

Career
Barrowman's biography of R.A.K. Mason, Mason: The Life of R.A.K. Mason, won the 2004 Montana New Zealand Book Award in the biography category. In 2010, Barrowman received the Michael King Writer's Fellowship from Creative New Zealand to write a biography of Maurice Gee. The book, Maurice Gee: Life and Work , was a finalist for the 2016 Ockham New Zealand Book Awards. Barrowman has also received the National Library Fellowship and the Stout Research Centre Fellowship.

Personal life
Barrowman was born and resides in Wellington.

Published books
 A Popular Vision: the Arts and the Left in New Zealand, 1930–1950 (1991, Victoria University Press)
 The Turnbull: a Library and Its World (1995, Auckland University Press)
 Victoria University of Wellington, 1899–1999: A History (1999, Victoria University Press)
 Mason: The Life of R.A.K. Mason (2003, Victoria University Press)
 Maurice Gee: Life and Work (2015, Victoria University Press)
Barrowman is also an editor of the Dictionary of New Zealand Biography.

References

Further reading 
 Rachel Barrowman in the New Zealand Electronic Text Collection

1963 births
Living people
20th-century New Zealand historians
Writers from Wellington City
21st-century New Zealand historians
New Zealand women historians